Walden is a residential neighbourhood in the southeast quadrant of Calgary, Alberta. It is located near the southern edge of the city, south of 194 Avenue SE and the neighbourhood of Chaparral. To the east it is bordered by the Bow River Valley, to the south by the neighbourhood of Legacy, and to the west by Macleod Trail.

Developed by Genstar, Walden was officially approved by Calgary City Council in July 2007, with construction expected to commence in 2008.

When completed, Walden will consist of three "villages", a  park system.
Walden falls within Ward 14 and is represented on City Council by a councillor.

Demographics 

Transit 
Walden is served by Calgary Transit Bus Routes 444, 167 and 168.

See also 
 List of neighbourhoods in Calgary

References

External links
Calgary Sun article on the announcement of Walden

Neighbourhoods in Calgary